William Sawelson (August 5, 1895 – October 26, 1918) was a sergeant in the U.S. Army during World War I. He received the Medal of Honor for valor in combat. The medal was posthumously presented to his father Jacob L. Sawelson at Governors Island.

He is buried at the Meuse-Argonne American Cemetery and Memorial east of the village of Romagne-sous-Montfaucon.

Medal of Honor citation
Rank and organization: Sergeant, U.S. Army, Company M, 312th Infantry, 78th Division.
Place and date: At Grand-Pre, France, October 26, 1918.
Entered service at: Harrison, N.J.
Born: August 5, 1895, Newark, N.J.
General Orders No.16, War Department, January 22, 1919.

Citation: 
Hearing a wounded man in a shell hole some distance away calling for water, Sgt. Sawelson, upon his own initiative, left shelter and crawled through heavy machinegun fire to where the man lay, giving him what water he had in his canteen. He then went back to his own shell hole, obtained more water, and was returning to the wounded man when he was killed by a machinegun bullet.

See also

List of Medal of Honor recipients
List of Jewish Medal of Honor recipients
List of Medal of Honor recipients for World War I

References

1895 births
1918 deaths
United States Army Medal of Honor recipients
American military personnel killed in World War I
United States Army soldiers
Military personnel from Newark, New Jersey
United States Army personnel of World War I
Jewish Medal of Honor recipients
World War I recipients of the Medal of Honor
20th-century American Jews